Victory is a planned light rail station on the Los Angeles County Metro Rail system. The station is part of the East San Fernando Light Rail Project and planned to open in 2028. It is located on Van Nuys Boulevard at the intersection with Victory Boulevard in the Van Nuys neighborhood of Los Angeles. The station is a split design, with the northbound platform on the north side of the intersection and the southbound platform the opposite.

References

Future Los Angeles Metro Rail stations
Railway stations scheduled to open in 2028
Van Nuys, Los Angeles